The 1987 All-Pacific-10 Conference football team consists of American football players chosen by various organizations for All-Pacific-10 Conference teams for the 1987 college football season.

Offensive selections

Quarterbacks
Troy Aikman, UCLA

Running backs
Gaston Green, UCLA
Steven Webster, USC
Darryl Harris, Arizona St.

Wide receivers
 Aaron Cox, Arizona St.
Derek Hill, Arizona

Tight ends
Paul Green, USC

Tackles
Dave Cadigan, USC
David Richards, UCLA

Guards
Randall McDaniel, Arizona St.
Mike Zandofsky, Washington

Centers
Joe Tofflemire, Arizona

Defensive selections

Linemen
Dana Wells, Arizona
Shawn Patterson, Arizona St.
Rollin Putzier, Oregon
Terry Tumey, UCLA

Linebackers
Carnell Lake, UCLA
Ken Norton Jr., UCLA
Greg Clark, Arizona St.
Ken Harvey, California

Defensive backs
Chuck Cecil, Arizona
Anthony Newman, Oregon
Brad Humphreys, Stanford

Special teams

Placekickers
Alfredo Velasco, UCLA

Punters
Scott Tabor. California

Return specialists 
Alan Grant, Stanford

Key

See also
1987 College Football All-America Team

References

All-Pacific-10 Conference Football Team
All-Pac-12 Conference football teams